Muratlar is a village in the Bolu District, Bolu Province, Turkey. Its population is 101 as of 2021.

References

Villages in Bolu District